"Rock Civilization" is a hardstyle track released on June 18, 2007 by Headhunterz through the Scantraxx sublabel Scantraxx Reloaded. It was featured on The Best of Headhunterz.

German band Scooter covered the melody of "Rock Civilization" for their single "Jumping All Over the World". Italian artist Technoboy remixed "Rock Civilization" for Scantraxx Reloaded 023, released on November 5, 2009.

References

Hardstyle songs